Nora Leticia Cardoza Vazquez (born 16 April 1983) is a Mexican professional boxer. She has challenged for world titles on three occasions; the WBC female atomweight title in 2013; WBA female atomweight title in 2019; and the WBA (Regular) female light flyweight title in December 2020. At regional level she held the NABF female atomweight title in 2014.

Professional career
Cardoza made her professional debut on 23 February 2007, scoring a second-round technical knockout (UD) victory against Magaly Avalos at the Palacio de los Combates in Durango City, Mexico.

After compiling a record of 7–3–2 (4 KO) she fought for her first championship—the vacant WBC Silver female atomweight title—against Ivoon Rosas on 3 May 2013, at the Palenque de la Feria in Durango City. Cardoza lost the bout via ten-round unanimous decision (UD).

She bounced back from defeat with an eight-round UD victory against Claudia Elizalde in August, before challenging reigning champion Momo Koseki for the WBC female atomweight title on 14 November at the Korakuen Hall in Tokyo, Japan. Cardoza failed in her first attempt to capture a world title, losing via UD with two judges scoring the bout 97–91 and the third judge scoring it 96–92.

In her next fight she defeated Lorena Mendoza by fourth-round stoppage via UD to capture the vacant NABF female atomweight title on 17 May 2014, at the Plaza de Toros Alejandra in Durango City.

Following five more wins, two by stoppage, Cardoza challenged Monserrat Alarcón for the WBA female atomweight title on 20 April 2019, at the Plaza Principal in Atotonilco El Alto, Mexico. Cardoza was defeated in her second attempt at a world title, losing via UD with two judges scoring the bout 100–90 and the third judge scored it 99–91.

After a UD defeat against Kim Clavel in June and a TKO victory against Ana Paola Guerva n August, she made a third attempt at a world championship, facing Guadalupe Bautista for the vacant WBA (Regular) female light flyweight title on 12 December 2020, at the Salon de Fiestas Figlos Stase in Culiacán, Mexico. Cardoza suffered the eighth defeat of her career, losing via shutout UD with all three judges scoring the bout 100–90.

Professional boxing record

References

External links

Living people
1983 births
Mexican women boxers
Boxers from Chihuahua (state)
Atomweight boxers
Light-flyweight boxers
People from Parral, Chihuahua